Raquel Simone Horton is a Bahamian Beauty Queen pageant title holder who won Miss Bahamas Universe 2004 among other pageant title crowns. She is also the first Bahamian Queen to capture both Miss Bahamas and Miss Teen Bahamas titles.

References

External links
missbahamas.org Blog

Bahamian beauty pageant winners
Living people
Miss Universe 2004 contestants
Year of birth missing (living people)